Joseph Barber (1757–1811) was an  English landscape painter and art teacher.

Joseph Barber  may also refer to:

Dr. Joseph L. Barber (1864–1940), Wisconsin State Senator
Joseph Vincent Barber (1788–1838), English artist and son of Joseph Barber

See also
Joseph Barber Lightfoot (1828–1889), English theologian and Bishop of Durham